Character (original Dutch title ) is a novel by Dutch author Ferdinand Bordewijk published in 1936. Subtitled "", "a novel of son and father", it is a Bildungsroman that traces the relationship between a stern father and his son. Character is Bordewijk's best-known novel, and the basis for a 1997 film of the same name.

References

1936 novels
Dutch bildungsromans
Realist novels
Novels set in the 1920s
Novels set in the Netherlands
Dutch novels adapted into films